Anahita Uberoi (born 1967) is an Indian actress working actively in theater circuit. Besides Uberoi also acted in some Hindi films.

Early life
Uberoi hails from a family of thespians to Vijaya Mehta and Farrokh Mehta. Uberoi started to work in her mother's troupe at age of 12. Uberoi did her schooling from The Cathedral & John Connon School, Mumbai and later studied psychology and sociology from St. Xavier's College, Mumbai. Subsequently, she trained Herbert Berghof Studio, New York and acted on Broadway, before returning to India.

Career
Anahita Uberoi worked in many English language plays like Rupert's Birthday, Going Solo, Glass Menagerie, Seascape with Sharks and Dancers and If Wishes Were Horses.
Uberoi also worked as assistant director to Gloria Muzio and Joe Dowling and worked with numerous American actors and actresses includes Jason Robards, Eli Wallach, Robert Sean, Leonard, Judd Hirsch and Mary Steenburgen. She has also appeared in 2003 hit film Jism, as Priyanka Kapoor.

References

External links

Living people
Hindi theatre
Indian film actresses
Indian stage actresses
Indian theatre directors
Indian women dramatists and playwrights
1967 births
Writers from Mumbai
St. Xavier's College, Mumbai alumni
20th-century Indian dramatists and playwrights
Women writers from Maharashtra
20th-century Indian women writers
Indian women theatre directors
Dramatists and playwrights from Maharashtra